"Love Calls" is a song written, produced and performed by American neo soul singer Kem, issued as the only official single from his debut studio album Kemistry ("Matter of Time" was later issued as a promotional single). The remix of the song features vocals from British neo soul group Floetry. The single peaked at #25 on the Billboard R&B chart in 2004.

Music video

The official music video for "Love Calls" was directed by Brian Campbell.

Charts

Weekly charts

Year-end charts

References

External links
 
 

2002 songs
2004 singles
2003 debut singles
Floetry songs
Kem (singer) songs
Motown singles
Song recordings produced by Kem (singer)
Songs written by Kem (singer)
Soul ballads
2000s ballads